Georges Lecomte (9 July 1867 – 27 August 1958) was a French novelist and playwright, who also wrote literary, historical and artistic studies.

Lecomte was born in Mâcon, Saône-et-Loire.  In 1924 he was elected to the Académie française, of which he became perpetual secretary in 1946. He was also director of the École Estienne.  He died in  Paris.

Works

Plays
La Meule, 4 acts, Paris, Théâtre-Libre, 26 February 1891
Mirages, 5 acts, Paris, Théâtre-Libre, 6 March 1893

Novels
Les Valets, contemporary novel (1898)
La Suzeraine (1898)
La Maison en fleurs (1900)
Les Cartons verts, contemporary novel (1901)
Le Veau d'or (1903)
Les Hannetons de Paris (1905)
L'Espoir (1908)
Bouffonneries dans la tempête (1921)
La Lumière retrouvée (1923)
Le Mort saisit le vif (1925)
Le Jeune Maître (1929)
Les Forces d'amour (1931)
Je n'ai menti qu'à moi-même (1932)
La Rançon (1941)
Servitude amoureuse (1949)
Le Goinfre vaniteux, comic=satirical novel (1951)

Other
L'Art impressioniste d'après la collection privée de M. Durand-Ruel (1892)
Espagne (1896)
Les Allemands chez eux (1910)
Les Lettres au service de la patrie (1917)
Pour celles qui pleurent, pour ceux qui souffrent (1917)
Clemenceau (1918)
Au chant de la Marseillaise. Danton et Robespierre. L'Ouragan de la Marseillaise. Marceau et Kléber (1919)
Louis Charlot (1925)
La Vie amoureuse de Danton (1927)
La Vie héroïque et glorieuse de Carpeaux (1928)
Les Prouesses du Bailli de Suffren (1929)
Le Gouvernement de M. Thiers (1930)
Thiers (1933)
Steinlen. Chats et autres Bêtes. Dessins inédits. Texte de Georges Lecomte (1933)
Gloire de l'Île-de-France (1934)
Ma traversée (1949)

References

External links
Georges Lecomte obituary - Montreal Gazette

1867 births
1958 deaths
People from Mâcon
19th-century French novelists
20th-century French novelists
19th-century French dramatists and playwrights
French literary critics
Members of the Académie Française
French male novelists
19th-century French male writers
20th-century French male writers
French male non-fiction writers